Megacraspedus pentheres is a moth of the family Gelechiidae. It was described by Walsingham in 1920. It is found in southern France.

The forewings are stone-whitish, dusted with brownish cinereous and with minute black speckling around the outer third of the costa, continuing around the apex and along the dorsum to within one-third of the base. There are also three small, elongate, black dots, one in the fold beyond the middle, another slightly above and beyond it on the disc, and a third in the same line with the latter, about the end of the cell. The middle spot is equidistant between the other two. The hindwings are shining, pale bluish grey.

References

Moths described in 1920
Megacraspedus